São Bento do Sul is a municipality, pop. 85,421 (2020) located in southern Brazil, in the northeast part of the state of Santa Catarina, just south of the state of Paraná.

Industry 

São Bento do Sul is considered to be an industrialized city.

There are many strong industries active in the region but the municipality is best known for its production of furniture and textiles.

Pioneer days 

São Bento do Sul was first settled by the Kolonisations Verein von 1849, in Hamburg, a 'for profit' colonization enterprise (as opposed to the State of provincial colonization efforts that were also taking place at that time) established in Hamburg, Germany.

Today there are different festivals celebrating the local population's immigrant roots: German, Italian, Polish, Czech, and others.

See also 

 Czech Brazilian
 Telephone booth

References

Municipalities in Santa Catarina (state)